Sybella Mary Crawley-Boevey was a British author of Victorian fiction novels. They are mostly out of print.

Biography 
Sybella Mary Crawley-Boevey was born in 1851 at Flaxley Abbey, Gloucestershire, the youngest daughter of Sir Martin Hyde Crawley-Boevey, 4th Baronet. She is the sister of author and civil servant Arthur William Crawley Boevey and the cousin of famous Victorian author Charlotte Mary Yonge.

In 1888, Crawley-Boevey wrote Dene Forest Sketches (1888), a study about the Forest of Dean where her father was the verderer. She followed this with two novels: the mystical-themed Beyond Cloudland (1888) and the love story Conscience Makes the Martyr (1894)

Works

References 

1851 births
1911 deaths
19th-century British novelists
People from Forest of Dean District
19th-century British women writers
19th-century British writers
British women novelists